Fish heads, either separated or still attached to the rest of the fish, are sometimes used in culinary dishes, or boiled for fish stock.

Anatomy

The head of a fish includes the snout, from the eye to the forward most point of the upper jaw, the operculum or gill cover (absent in sharks and jawless fish), and the cheek, which extends from eye to preopercle. The operculum and preopercle may or may not have spines. In sharks and some primitive bony fish, a spiracle, a small extra gill opening, is found behind each eye.

The skull in fishes is formed from a series of only loosely connected bones. Jawless fish and sharks possess only a cartilaginous endocranium, with both the upper and lower jaws being separate elements. Bony fishes have an additional dermal bone, forming a more or less coherent skull roof in lungfish and holost fish. The lower jaw defines a chin.

Cultural aspects

In some Jewish communities, it is traditional to eat a fish head for Rosh Hashana (literally "head of the year").

In Chinese dining culture, the fish head is usually given to and eaten by the most senior person at the table. 

In Sicilian witchcraft, it is customary to leave a fish head on the doorstep of one's enemy to ward off malicious intention.  It is also performed by the eldest grandma when a mafia fishing family has been wronged by a business partner. The practice dates back to at least 1308, when Dante referenced it in his epic, the Divine Comedy. 

In a more serious feud, escalation of hostilities can be signaled by the appearance of a goat head or horse head. 

Fish heads are the subject of the 1978 novelty song "Fish Heads" by The rock duo Barnes & Barnes. 

There are many references to talking fish heads in various dream sequences featuring Tony Soprano in the HBO series The Sopranos.

Fish heads gained notoriety in 2009 with a Green Peace publicity stunt in which members of the activist group dumped 5 tons of fish heads on the door step of the French Fisheries Ministry.

Culinary Use

See also

 Bighead carp, prized for the meat on its head
 List of seafood dishes

Notes

External links
 Generalized fish heads  University of California.

Head
Head
Witchcraft in Italy